The 2017–18 Primeira Liga (also known as Liga NOS for sponsorship reasons) was the 84th season of the Primeira Liga, the top professional league for Portuguese association football clubs. Benfica were the defending champions for a fourth consecutive time, but they did not retain the title. Porto became the new champions with two matches to spare, clinching their 28th league title. This was their first trophy in four years.

Since Portugal dropped from fifth to seventh place in the UEFA association coefficient rankings at the end of 2016–17 season, only the two best-ranked teams could qualify for the UEFA Champions League (the champions entered directly into the group stage, and the runners-up entered the third qualifying round). The third and fourth-placed teams qualified respectively to the UEFA Europa League third and second qualifying rounds.

Teams
Eighteen teams competed in the league – the top sixteen teams from the 2016–17 season, as well as two teams promoted from the LigaPro.

Portimonense became the first club to be promoted on 23 April 2017 and will play in Primeira Liga for the first time since the 2010–11 season. On 21 May 2017, after a 2–1 win in Azores against Santa Clara, they were crowned champions. The other team promoted were runners-up Desportivo das Aves, following a 2–2 draw against União da Madeira on 30 April 2017. This will mark the return of the Vila das Aves' team to the top flight after a 10-season absence.

The two promoted clubs replaced Nacional and Arouca. Nacional confirmed their relegation on 5 May 2017, 15 years after their promotion, when Moreirense, who were also struggling to escape relegation, beat Braga. On the last matchday, Arouca's 4–2 defeat against Estoril sealed their relegation, four seasons after having been promoted for the first time to Primeira Liga.

Stadia and locations

Personnel and sponsors

Managerial changes

Season summary

League table

Positions by round

Results

Statistics

Top goalscorers

Hat-tricks

Note
4 Player scored 4 goals

Top assists

Clean sheets

Scoring
 First goal of the season:
  Gelson Martins, for Sporting CP vs Desportivo das Aves (6 August 2017)
 Latest goal of the season:
  Gevorg Ghazaryan, for Marítimo vs Sporting CP (13 May 2018)
 Biggest home win:
 Braga 6–0 Estoril (1 October 2017)
 Biggest away win:
 Estoril 0–6 Braga (3 March 2018)
 Highest scoring match: 7 goals
 Porto 5–2 Portimonense (22 September 2017)
 Porto 6–1 Paços de Ferreira (21 October 2017)
 Portimonense 5–2 Vitória de Setúbal (30 October 2017)
 Biggest winning margin: 6 goals
 Braga 6–0 Estoril (1 October 2017)
 Most goals scored in a match by a team: 6 goals
 Braga 6–0 Estoril (1 October 2017)
 Porto 6–1 Paços de Ferreira (21 October 2017)

Match streaks

 Longest winning run: 9 matches
 Benfica, from matchday 21 (3 February 2018) to matchday 29 (7 April 2017)
 Longest unbeaten run: 25 matches
 Porto, from matchday 1 (6 August 2017) to matchday 25 (2 March 2018)
 Longest winless run: 11 matches
 Estoril, from matchday 4 (27 August 2017) to matchday 14 (9 December 2017)
 Longest losing run: 8 matches
 Estoril, from matchday 4 (27 August 2017) to matchday 11 (4 November 2017)
 Most consecutive draws: 5 matches
 Vitória de Setúbal, from matchday 16 (4 January 2018) to matchday 20 (31 January 2018)

Discipline

Club
 Most yellow cards: 104
 Feirense
 Most red cards: 8
 Paços de Ferreira

Player
 Most yellow cards: 14
  Babanco (Feirense)
 Most red cards: 3
  Marcão (Rio Ave)
  Hassan Yebda (Belenenses)

Awards

Monthly awards

Liga Portugal

SJPF Young Player of the Month

SPJF Goal of the month

Annual awards

Liga Portugal

Player of the Season 
The Player of the Season was awarded to  Bruno Fernandes (Sporting CP).

Manager of the Season 
The Manager of the Season was awarded to  Sérgio Conceição (Porto).

Goal of the Season 
The Goal of the Season was awarded to  Rodrigo Pinho (Marítimo), against Tondela on 28 October 2017.

Team of the Season 
The Team of the Season was:
 Goalkeeper:  Rui Patrício (Sporting CP)
 Defence:  Alex Telles (Porto),  Felipe (Porto),  Sebastián Coates (Sporting CP),  Ricardo Pereira (Porto)
 Midfield:  Bruno Fernandes (Sporting CP),  Héctor Herrera (Porto),  Pizzi (Benfica)
 Attack:  Jonas (Benfica),  Moussa Marega (Porto),  Gelson Martins (Sporting CP)

Young Player of the Season 
The Young Player of the Year was awarded to  Rúben Dias (Benfica).

Club Fair-Play Prize 
The Club Fair-Play Prize was awarded to Chaves.

Player Fair-Play Prize 
The Player Fair-Play Prize was awarded to  Casillas (Porto).

SPJF

Goal of the season
The goal of the season was disputed by all the previous winners of the monthly polls.

Attendances

References

Primeira Liga seasons
Port
1